Batseri is a village in Sangla Valley in the Kinnaur district of Himachal Pradesh state of India.

A deadly rockfall occurred near Batseri on 25 July 2021, killing 9 people, all of whom were traveling in a van that was struck by a boulder.

See also 
 Sangla Valley

External links 
 Sangla Valley Travelblog
 Baspa Valley blog

References 

Villages in Kinnaur district